Jaan is an Estonian masculine, a cognate of the English-language given name John.

People named Jaan include:
Jaan Anvelt (1884–1937), Estonian communist revolutionary
Jaan Arder (born 1952), Estonian singer
Jaan Ehlvest (born 1962), Estonian chess player
Jaan Eigo (1866–1946), Estonian politician 
Jaan Eilart (1933–2006), Estonian biologist
Jaan Einasto (born 1929), Estonian astrophysicist
Jaan Hargel (1912–1966), Estonian conductor, music teacher, oboe player and flautist
Jaan Eslon (1952–2000), Estonian-Swedish chess player
Jaan Hünerson (1882–1942), Estonian agronomist and politician
Jaan Isotamm (1939–2014), Estonian poet
Jaan Jaago (1887–1949), Estonian wrestler
Jaan Jung (1835–1900), Estonian educator, archeologist and historian
Jaan Jüris (born 1977), Estonian ski jumper 
Jaan Kalviste (1898–1936), Estonian chemist, educator, and translator
Jaan Kaplinski (1941–2021), Estonian poet, philosopher, and culture critic
Jaan Kärner (1891–1958), Estonian poet and writer
Jaan Kiivit Sr. (1906–1971), Estonian Archbishop
Jaan Kiivit, Jr. (1940–2005), Estonian Archbishop
Jaan Kikkas (1892–1944), Estonian weightlifter
Jaan Kirsipuu (born 1969), Estonian road bicycle racer
Jaan Klõšeiko (1939–2016), Estonian printmaker and photographer
Jaan Kolberg (born 1958), Estonian film director and producer
Jaan Kokk (1903–1942), Estonian politician 
Jaan Kriisa (1882–1942), Estonian lawyer and politician
Jaan Kross (1920–2007), Estonian contemporary writer
Jaan Kruus (1884–1942), Estonian military General
Jaan Kruusvall (1940–2012), Estonian writer and playwright
Jaan Kundla (born 1937), Estonian politician
Jaan Laaman (born 1948), American member of the United Freedom Front
Jaan Lattik, (1878–1967), Estonian politician and writer
Jaan Lepp (1895–1941), Estonian track and field athlete and soldier
Jaan J. Leppik (born 1969), Estonian clergyman and politician
Jaan Lippmaa (1942–2021), Estonian engineer and politician
Jaan Lõo (1872–1939), Estonian Supreme Court judge, poet and politician
Jaan Lüllemets (1932–2004), Estonian politician 
Jaan Maide (1896–1945), Estonian Army officer and commander
Jaan Manitski (born 1942), Estonian politician
Jaan Mark (born 1951), Estonian politician
Jaan Masing (1875–1948), Estonian politician
Jaan Miger (1859–1940), Estonian politician
Jaan Patterson (born 1975), German American writer and composer, founder of the netlabel Surrism-Phonoethics
Jaan Pehk (born 1975), Estonian writer, singer and guitarist
Jaan Piiskar (1883–1942), Estonian educator and politician
Jaan Põdra (1894–1942), Estonian politician
Jaan Port (1891–1951), Estonian botanist
Jaan Poska (1866–1920), Estonian barrister and politician
Jaan Puhvel (born 1932), Estonian-American Indo-Europeanist
Jaan Puidet (born 1992),  Estonian basketball player
Jaan Rääts (1932–2020), Estonian film score composer
Jaan Rannap (born 1931), Estonian children's writer
Jaan Raudsepp (1873–1945), Estonian politician
Jaan Rekkor (born 1958), Estonian actor
Jaan Ruus (1938–2017), Estonian film critic, journalist and film editor
Jaan Sarv (1877–1954), Estonian mathematician and pedagogue
Jaan Soots (1880–1942), Estonian military commander
Jaan Tallinn (born 1972), Estonian programmer
Jaan Talts (born 1944), Estonian weightlifter
Jaan Tätte (born 1964), Estonian playwright, poet, actor, and singer
Jaan Teemant (1872–?), Estonian lawyer and politician
Jaan Tiidemann (born 1971), Estonian architect
Jaan Tõnisson (1868–?), Estonian statesman
Jaan Toomik (born 1961), Estonian video artist and a painter
Jaan Tooming (born 1946), Estonian actor, stage and film director and writer
Jaan Treumann (1881–1941), Estonian Lutheran clergyman, educator and politician
Jaan Usin (1887–1941), Estonian Navy commander
Jaan Vain (1886–1942), Estonian lawyer and politician
Jaan Valsiner (born 1951), Estonian-American psychologist

Fictional characters
Jaan Tatikas, protagonist in the Eduard Bornhöhe's novel Tallinna narrid ja narrikesed, who has become a well-known stereotype in Estonian culture

See also 
 
 
 Jaana, given name
 Jaani (disambiguation)
 Jaanus, given name
 Jan (disambiguation)
 Ján
 Jāņi, summer solstice (Midsummer)
 Alternate forms for the name John

References

Estonian masculine given names